When the going gets tough, the tough get going is a popular witticism in American English.

It may also refer to:

 the song by Billy OceanWhen the Going Gets Tough, the Tough Get Going (song)
 the album by English new wave band Bow Wow WowWhen the Going Gets Tough, the Tough Get Going (album)